Kevin Brian Harrington (January 9, 1929 – November 27, 2008) was a Massachusetts politician who served as President of the Massachusetts State Senate.

Early life, education, and career
Harrington attended Saint Louis University on a basketball scholarship. He taught government and history and coached basketball at Merrimack College.

He was a member of the Salem City Council during 1957–1959 and was elected to the State Senate in 1958. He became Senate President in 1971. He retired from the Senate in 1978 amid an investigation into a $2,000 illegal campaign check he allegedly cashed in 1970.

Kevin B. Harrington Student Ambassador Program – Saint Anselm College 
Harrington was a member of Saint Anselm College Board of Trustees and was instrumental in the creation of the New Hampshire Institute of Politics at the college. Because of his work at Saint Anselm College, The Kevin B. Harrington Student Ambassador Program is named in his legacy.

See also
 1959–1960 Massachusetts legislature
 1961–1962 Massachusetts legislature
 1963–1964 Massachusetts legislature
 1965–1966 Massachusetts legislature
 1967–1968 Massachusetts legislature
 1969–1970 Massachusetts legislature
 1971–1972 Massachusetts legislature
 1973–1974 Massachusetts legislature
 1975–1976 Massachusetts legislature
 1977–1978 Massachusetts legislature
The Harrington family

References 

 

1929 births
2008 deaths
Democratic Party Massachusetts state senators
Presidents of the Massachusetts Senate
Saint Louis Billikens men's basketball players
20th-century American politicians
American men's basketball players